Euxoa vitta is a moth of the family Noctuidae. It is found in central and southern Europe.

Description
The wingspan is 32–40 mm. Warren states E. vitta Esp. (7 b). Distinguished from recussa, and islandica and the forms of tritici by the broad vitta, greyish white costal streak; a local species, found only in Switzerland, Austria and Hungary.

Biology
Adults are on wing from August to October. There is one generation per year.

References

External links
Fauna Europaea

Euxoa
Moths of Europe
Moths of Asia
Moths described in 1789